Zhigang Suo (born June 15, 1963) is the Allen E. and Marilyn M. Puckett Professor of Mechanics and Materials in the Harvard School of Engineering and Applied Sciences. His research centers on the mechanical behavior of materials and structures.

Early life and education
Suo received a B.S. degree in solid mechanics from Xi'an Jiaotong University in 1985 and a Ph.D. in mechanical engineering from Harvard University in 1989, advised by John W. Hutchinson.

Career
Suo joined the faculty of the University of California at Santa Barbara, and established a research group studying the mechanics of materials and structures. The group moved to Princeton University in 1997, and to Harvard University in 2003. He studied basic processes, including fracture, deformation, polarization, and diffusion, driven by various thermodynamic forces (e.g., stress, electric field, electron wind, chemical potential). He developed applications for microelectronics, large-area electronics, soft materials, active materials, and lithium-ion batteries.

With Teng Li, Suo co-founded iMechanica, the web of mechanics and mechanicians. In 2015, iMechanica has over 20,000 registered users. He is a member of the Executive Committee (2005-2010, Chair 2010) of the Applied Mechanics Division, of the American Society of Mechanical Engineers (ASME), and is a member at large of the US National Committee on Theoretical and Applied Mechanics (2006-2012).

Suo is a recipient of the Humboldt Research Award. He won the Pi Tau Sigma Gold Medal and the Special Achievement Award for Young Investigators in Applied Mechanics, both from ASME. He received the William Prager Medal, Society of Engineering Sciences.  He is a member of the US National Academy of Engineering and the US National Academy of Sciences.

Suo is the author of many peer-reviewed articles, including "Mixed mode cracking in layered materials", (JW Hutchinson, Z Suo), Advances in applied mechanics 29 (63) and "Fracture mechanics for piezoelectric ceramics", (Z Suo, CM Kuo, DM Barnett, JR Willis), Journal of the Mechanics and Physics of Solids 40 (4).  In 2015, he contributed to the article "Syringe-injectable electronics", which was published in Nature Nanotechnology.

References

External links 
 Zhigang Suo's official homepage
 
 Zhigang Suo at the Mathematical Genealogy Project
 Google Scholar page for Zhigang Suo

1963 births
Living people
People from Xi'an
Scientists from Shaanxi
Xi'an Jiaotong University alumni
Harvard University faculty
Harvard School of Engineering and Applied Sciences alumni
Members of the United States National Academy of Engineering
Members of the United States National Academy of Sciences
Chinese emigrants to the United States
American mechanical engineers
Chinese mechanical engineers
Engineers from Shaanxi
Educators from Shaanxi